The 2007 Generali Ladies Linz is the 2007 Tier II WTA Tour tournament of the annually-held Generali Ladies Linz tennis tournament. It was the 21st edition of the tournament and was held from October 22–28, 2007 at the TipsArena Linz. Daniela Hantuchová won the singles title.

The total prize pot for the tournament was US$600,000 with the winner of the singles receiving $88,265 and the losing finalist $47,125. The winners of the doubles competition received $27,730.

Finals

Singles

  Daniela Hantuchová defeated   Patty Schnyder 6–4, 6–2 
It was Hantuchová's second title of the year, and 3rd of her career.

Doubles

 Cara Black /  Liezel Huber defeated  Katarina Srebotnik /  Ai Sugiyama 6–2, 3–6, 10–8

References

External links
Official website

Generali Ladies Linz
Linz Open
Generali Ladies Linz
Generali Ladies Linz
Generali